Zangilan International Airport is an airport  in the city of Zangilan in Azerbaijan. The construction of the airport began in May 2021 and the airport was inaugurated on 20 October 2022 by the president of Azerbaijan Ilham Aliyev and president of Turkey Recep Tayyip Erdogan.  It is one of the country's eight international airports.

See also
Fuzuli International Airport
Lachin International Airport
Azerbaijani construction in areas gained in the 2020 Nagorno-Karabakh war

References 

Buildings and structures in Azerbaijan
Airports in Azerbaijan
Zangilan District
2022 establishments in Azerbaijan